The Fell & Rock Climbing Club of the English Lake District (in everyday usage the Fell and Rock Club or  FRCC) is the senior climbing club covering the English Lake District. It was founded in 1906–1907 and, amongst its other activities, publishes the rock climbing guides to the area. It owns many of the early climbing photographs (e.g. Hankinson, 1975) taken by George & Ashley Abraham, who were founding members.

Early history
The club had been originally proposed by John Wilson Robinson about 1887, approximately when rock climbing began as a sport in England. Robinson, owner of a farm and, later, an estate agent's business in Keswick, climbed with Walter Parry Haskett Smith, generally acknowledged as the father of rock climbing in Great Britain, and it was Robinson – in 1885 - who introduced the use of the alpine rope in the Lake District.

Ashley Abraham was elected the first president of the FRCC, with Robinson one of its two vice-presidents. The chief objective of the club was:

"To encourage and foster under the safest and most helpful of conditions the exhilarating exercise and sport of Fell Rambling and Rock Climbing in the Lake District."

Safety was an issue at the time, since several fatal accidents had occurred recently. Alluding to these, Abraham commented at the first annual dinner:

"Lack of discretion is a great evil in rock climbing, but there is another evil equally as great, and that is competitive climbing. This has been the fundamental cause of most of our home accidents . . ."

Memorial

A plaque commemorating members of the Fell & Rock Climbing Club who died in World War I is set on the summit rock of Great Gable; an annual memorial service is held there on Remembrance Sunday.  The club bought 3,000 acres of land including Great Gable and donated it to the National Trust in memory of these members, and the plaque was dedicated on Whit Sunday 1924 by Geoffrey Winthrop Young in front of 500 people. The bronze memorial, weighing 70 kg, was removed in July 2013 and a replacement, with spelling errors corrected, was installed by Royal Engineers in October 2013.

Publications
The FRCC produce a selection of rock climbing guides to the Lake District which are periodically updated. Below is a list of their current publications:

 A Lakeland Climbing Pioneer: John Wilson Robinson of Whinfell Hall by Michael Waller (Carlisle, Bookcase, 2008)
Lake District Rock (Joint publication with Wired Guides - 2015)
Buttermere & St Bees (2008)
Gable & Pillar (2007)
Langdale (2013)
Borrowdale (2016)
Scafell & Wasdale - CB Centenary Edition (2014)
Dow, Duddon & Slate (1994) (Out of print)
Lake District Winter Climbs (Cicerone Press - 2012)
The Lakeland Fells (1996) (Out of Print)
Eden Valley & South Lakes Limestone (2012)
Eastern Crags (2011)
Lake District New Climbs & Notes (2018)

See also
Other UK Mountaineering 'Senior Clubs':
The Alpine Club
Climbers' Club
The Rucksack Club
Scottish Mountaineering Club
The Wayfarers' Club

Notes

References

External links
Fell & Rock website

Climbing clubs in the United Kingdom
Climbing organizations
Lake District